Big Creek is a stream in Iron and Wayne counties of the U.S. state of Missouri. It is a tributary of the St. Francis River.

Big Creek was so named on account of its relatively large size.

See also
List of rivers of Missouri

References

Rivers of Iron County, Missouri
Rivers of Wayne County, Missouri
Rivers of Missouri